John Blake is an American make-up artist. He has been nominated for one Academy Award, for the film Hoffa. He shared the nomination with Ve Neill and Greg Cannom. He has worked on films for directors like Oliver Stone and the Coen brothers as key make-up artist on Nixon, U Turn, and Fargo. In more recent years, he has worked on The Avengers, the Iron Man trilogy, There Will Be Blood, Tropic Thunder, and many other films over a 30-year career.

Awards

Phoenix Film Critics Society Awards
Planet of the Apes (2001 film)

References

External links

John Blake Wigs
Makeup and SFX Reel on Vimeo

American make-up artists
Living people
Year of birth missing (living people)